Oridathoru Phayalvaan is a 1981 Indian Malayalam-language drama film written, edited and directed by P. Padmarajan. The film is a folk parable about the success and failure in the life of a gatta gusthi wrestler in Kerala. It stars Rashid, Nedumudi Venu and Jayanthi.

The film won the award for best script at the Kuala Lumpur International Film Festival, and a gold medal at the Asian Film Festival.

Plot 

Patronized by a village tailor, a gatta gusthi wrestler becomes a local hero when he defeats all his opponents and claims the prettiest woman as his wife. As a story within a story it also portrays how the tailor makes a profit from the illiterate wrestler. He marries a girl, only for it to be revealed later that he has another wife and isn't interested in her more than a trophy. He abandons his wife and the village when his wife falls for other men in his absence and she acknowledges that she doesn't love him any more. He leaves her his signature drawing of a conch shell. A frog gigging neighbour youth is entrapped by the girl's mother to marry her conceived daughter. Nah, it's way more than that, it's about a illiterate man thinking of his craft as being more than money.

Cast 
 Rashid as A Gatta gusthi phayalvaan (wrestler)
 Nedumudi Venu as Shivanpillai (Mesthiri)
 Jayanthi as Chakkara, the woman courted by the wrestler
 K. G. Devakiyamma as Chakkara's mother
 Ashokan as Kannan
 Jayadevan as Job
 Kariyachan
 Krishnankutty Nair as Veloonju (Kannan's father)
 Dhanya
 Mavelikkara Ramachandran
 Said
 Rishikesha Das
 Raju Paakkathu

References

External links 
 

1980s Malayalam-language films
1981 films
Films directed by Padmarajan
Films scored by Johnson
Films with screenplays by Padmarajan